Baseball Fanatic is a 1986 video game published by Performing Arts Software.

Gameplay
Baseball Fanatic is a game in which the player can choose from five different levels of play which affect the offensive production of the players.

Reception
Johnny Wilson reviewed the game for Computer Gaming World, and stated that "Unlike most statistical games, the game plays one pitch at a time, which allows you to mix up your pitches and attempt to fool each batter."

References

1986 video games